Mycobacterium nebraskense is a slow growing, yellow, pigmented mycobacterium that was first isolated from human sputum at the University of Nebraska Medical Center, in Omaha, Nebraska, USA. Mycobacterium species are common causes of pulmonary infections in both humans and animals.

References

External links
Type strain of Mycobacterium nebraskense at BacDive -  the Bacterial Diversity Metadatabase

Acid-fast bacilli
nebraskense
Bacteria described in 2004